Robert Joseph Moore House is a historic home located at Bynum, Chatham County, North Carolina. It was built in 1929, and is a two-story, four-square, brick dwelling with a brick foundation and a low pyramidal roof with Colonial Revival and American Craftsman design elements.  Also on the property are the contributing garage (c. 1930) and barn (c. 1930).

It was listed on the National Register of Historic Places in 1998.

References

Houses on the National Register of Historic Places in North Carolina
Colonial Revival architecture in North Carolina
Houses completed in 1929
Houses in Chatham County, North Carolina
National Register of Historic Places in Chatham County, North Carolina